The 2002 Batang Red Bull Thunder season was the third season of the franchise in the Philippine Basketball Association (PBA).

Draft picks

Occurrences
Fil-foreigners Davonn Harp and Mick Pennissi were selected as aspirants for the National team in the coming Busan Asian Games in South Korea. Both players were on loan to the Philippine-Hapee toothpaste training squad during the season's first offing.

Championship
Last year's Commissioner's Cup Best Import Tony Lang came back and teamed up with fellow returnee Julius Nwosu to help Batang Red Bull retain the title they won last season. The Thunder reached the finals against Talk 'N Text Phone Pals. After four games and the series tied at two games apiece, Lang was accused of game-fixing and was replaced by NBA veteran Sean Lampley.

Batang Red Bull won their second PBA title in three years by defeating the Talk 'N Text Phone Pals in seven games. The Thunder overcame a 2-3 series deficit by taking the last two games to successfully defend the Commissioner's Cup crown.

Transactions

Roster

Elimination round

Games won

References

Barako Bull Energy Boosters seasons
Batang